Saurabh Garg is Chief executive officer, UIDAI, IAS of the 1991 batch of the Odisha cadre with the rank of Additional Secretary, Government of India.

Education 
Garg holds a PhD from Johns Hopkins University in Economics, a Master of Business Administration the from Indian Institute of Management Ahmedabad, and received a Bachelor of Technology from IIT Delhi. Garg did his Master's in Economics at the London School of Economics.

Contribution 
Garg is the person behind Direct Benefit Transfer and Foreign direct investment.

References 

Living people
Year of birth missing (living people)
Indian Administrative Service officers
Johns Hopkins University alumni
Indian Institute of Management Ahmedabad alumni
IIT Delhi alumni
Alumni of the London School of Economics